Louis Angelo Figaro, Jr. (October 12, 1920 – October 25, 1954) was an American racecar driver. He was the son of Louis Angelo Figaro (LeoLuca Ficara) and Amanda Bartley. His father immigrated from Corleone, Sicily in 1903.

Figaro competed in 17 NASCAR Cup Series races from 1951 to 1954, picking up one victory in the 1951 event at Carrell Speedway in Gardena, California. He was seriously injured in an accident during the 1954 Wilkes 160 at North Wilkesboro Speedway on October 24, 1954, when his vehicle smashed through the guardrail and overturned with three laps left. He died in the hospital the following day.

In 2002, Figaro was inducted into the West Coast Stock Car Hall of Fame. His granddaughter, Tracy Figaro-Davis, accepted.

References

External links

Lou Figaro, Legends Of NASCAR
Lou Figaro, Motorsport Memorial

1920 births
1954 deaths
Sportspeople from Inglewood, California
Racing drivers from California
Racing drivers from Los Angeles
NASCAR drivers
Racing drivers who died while racing
Sports deaths in North Carolina